Snježana Tribuson (born 8 February 1957) is a Croatian screenwriter and film director. She directed more than ten films since 1981. In 1998 she won the Golden Arena for Best Screenplay for the film The Three Men of Melita Žganjer.

Selected filmography

References

External links 

1957 births
Living people
People from Bjelovar
Croatian film directors
Croatian screenwriters
Golden Arena winners